Guararema is a municipality in the state of São Paulo in Brazil. It is part of the Metropolitan Region of São Paulo. The population is 30,136 (2020 est.) in an area of 270.82 km².

The Florestan Fernandes School of the Landless Workers' Movement is located here.

See also
 List of cities in São Paulo, Brazil

References

External links
  Guararema City Administration
  Page About Guararema City 

Municipalities in São Paulo (state)